Homoranthus lunatus, commonly known as crescent-leaved homoranthus, is a flowering plant in the family Myrtaceae and is endemic to a small area in northern New South Wales. It is a spreading shrub with curved leaves and small groups of up to six yellow flowers in leaf axils.

Description
Flowering occurs from July to November and fruits August to December.

Taxonomy and naming
Homoranthus lunatus was first formally described in 1991 by Lyndley Craven and S.R.Jones and the description was published in Australian Systematic Botany. The specific epithet (lunatus) is a Latin word meaning "shaped like a crescent moon".

Distribution and habitat
Only found in a single population in Torrington district and locations in Boonoo Boonoo and Basket Swamp National Parks north east of Tenterfield New South Wales. 
Grows in heath on shallow sandy soils on and around granite outcrops.

Conservation status
Considered vulnerable by Briggs and Leigh (1996). ROTAP code 2VCt.  The plant should be considered rare.

References

External links
 The Australasian Virtual Herbarium – Occurrence data for Homoranthus lunatus

Flora of New South Wales
Myrtales of Australia
lunatus
Plants described in 1991